Ximen (formerly transliterated as Hsimen Station until 2003) is a metro station in Taipei, Taiwan served by Taipei Metro. The station is named after the former west gate of the city, whose location is roughly where the current station is located.

Station overview

The station is a three-level, underground structure with two island platforms and six exits, allowing possible connections to the shopping areas and the Diary of Ximen hotel. The two platforms are stacked, thus allowing for cross-platform interchange between the Green Line and the Blue Line. Restrooms are inside the entrance area. In November 2010, the daily ridership at Ximen station was 112,000, making it the fourth busiest station on the network, just behind Taipei Main Station, Taipei City Hall and Zhongxiao Fuxing station.

It is situated under Zhonghua Rd, at the intersection of Chengdu Rd, Hengyang Rd, and Baoqing Rd. The station is also connected to the Ximen Intelligent Library (an unmanned branch of the Taipei Public Library).

Exit 6 is heavily used by those accessing the Ximending shopping area. The exit opening is set at the top of the pedestrian zone, although there is still vehicular traffic in that area. The station is often crowded on weekends, especially in the afternoon.

Station layout

History
During Japanese rule, a railway station at the current site was called  and opened on 5 November 1930. It was specifically for refueling and its location was roughly where the current MRT station is today.

After the war during post-war rebuilding, the station's name was changed to the current "Ximen". It was later closed due to illegal construction. An underground emergency station opened on 2 September 1987 as part of the Taipei Railway Underground Project.

Ximen railway station used to be a station on the TRA Western Line. However, the underground area is nowadays only used as an emergency station and not open for revenue service.

Construction of Ximen MRT station started in 1995, and the station opened on 24 December 1999 for the Blue line. On 30 August 2000, a service to  opened. Under that operation, only 3 platforms were used so platforms 2 and 4 would switch service every 6 months. After the Xinyi Line opened, the shuttle service was extended to  until the  opened on 15 November 2014.

Around the Station

 Ximending
 Zhongshan Hall
 The Red House
 Nishi Honganji Relics
 Supreme Court

References

Songshan–Xindian line stations
Bannan line stations
Railway stations opened in 1999
1999 establishments in Taiwan